Even Stevens is an American comedy television series.

Even Stevens or variants may also refer to:

Even Stevens (album), an album by Ray Stevens
Even Stevens (horse), a Thoroughbred racehorse
The Even Stevens Movie, a film based on the TV series
 Even Stephen, a 1934 play
 "Even Steven" (song), a song by Tom Robinson on the 1982 album Cabaret '79

See also
 Evan Stephens, Latter-day Saint composer and hymn writer
 Even Stevphen, a recurring segment on The Daily Show featuring Steve Carell and Stephen Colbert